Jyoti (born 17 December 1985) is an Indian wrestler. She represented India in the women's freestyle 75 kg category at the 2014 Commonwealth Games in Glasgow in which she placed fourth. 2014 Asian Games in (INCHEON) She placed fourth

References

External links
 Jyoti Profile at International Wrestling Database

Living people
1985 births
Indian female sport wrestlers
Wrestlers at the 2014 Asian Games
Sportswomen from Delhi
21st-century Indian women
21st-century Indian people
Asian Games competitors for India
Wrestlers at the 2014 Commonwealth Games
Commonwealth Games competitors for India
Asian Wrestling Championships medalists